The Death of Adonis is a 1700-1710 marble sculpture by Giuseppe Mazzuoli, now in the Hermitage Museum. The tale of the death of Adonis comes from Ovid's Metamorphoses and tells of the handsome youth, beloved of the goddess Venus, who died whilst out hunting boar. It entered in the Hermitage in 1923; formerly in the Musin-Pushkin collection.

References

Sculptures of the Hermitage Museum
18th-century sculptures
1700s works
Sculptures based on Metamorphoses